Katherine Louise Pulford (born 27 August 1980) is a New Zealand former cricketer who played as an all-rounder, bowling right-arm medium and batting right-handed. She appeared in 1 Test match, 46 One Day Internationals and 12 Twenty20 Internationals for New Zealand between 1999 and 2010. Her performances at the 2009 Women's Cricket World Cup saw her named in the ICC's team of the tournament. She played domestic cricket for Central Districts, Northern Districts, Western Australia and Australian Capital Territory.

References

External links

1980 births
Living people
Cricketers from Nelson, New Zealand
New Zealand women cricketers
New Zealand women Test cricketers
New Zealand women One Day International cricketers
New Zealand women Twenty20 International cricketers
Central Districts Hinds cricketers
Northern Districts women cricketers
Western Australia women cricketers
ACT Meteors cricketers